Oleg Mikhaylovich Gazmanov (born 22 July 1951, in Gusev) is a Soviet and Russian singer, composer and poet, specializing in patriotic and nationalist songs, as well as songs which cover more conventional pop themes. Gazmanov is leader of pop group "Эскадрон" (Squadron). His songs have been covered by others in the Russian chanson style, such as Mikhail Shufutinsky. He is also a Candidate for Master of Sport of the USSR in gymnastics and is well known for his acrobatics performed during live shows, especially at the beginning of his musical career in the early 1990s.

On 18 March 2022, Gazmanov sang at Vladimir Putin's Moscow rally celebrating the annexation of Crimea by the Russian Federation from Ukraine and justifying the 2022 Russian invasion of Ukraine. In April and May 2022, Gazmanov participated in a series of concerts organized in order to support the invasion.

In the nationalist song Сделан в СССР (Sdelan v SSSR) (en. Made in the U.S.S.R.), which was performed at the 2022 Moscow rally and released originally in 2005, Gazmanov glorifies the communist past of today's Russia while presenting Lenin and Stalin as national heroes, under whom millions of Russians were imprisoned, executed or died of starvation. Furthermore, the song considers Ukraine, Moldova and the Baltic states along with many more sovereign countries as part of the same country.

Sanctions
In July 2014 Gazmanov was banned from entering Latvia by Latvia's foreign minister Edgars Rinkēvičs allegedly "through words and actions having contributed to the undermining of Ukraine's sovereignty and territorial integrity".

Commenting on the Latvian Foreign Minister's decision, Gazmanov said, "This gesture right before the opening of the New Wave festival in Jurmala endangers the entire cultural and economic relations between our countries.".

In August 2015, the Security Service of Ukraine placed Gazmanov on the list of artists whose activity posed a threat to Ukraine's national security.

In August 2016, the Lithuanian government also denied his entry to Lithuania at Vilnius airport.

In February 2023 Canada sanctioned Oleg Gazmanov for being involved in Russian propaganda and spreading misinformation relating to the 2022 war in Ukraine.

Popular songs
"Ofitsery" 
"Moskva" 
"Nikto krome nas"
"Moi yasnye dni"
"Eskadron" 
"Esaul" 
"A Ya Devushek Lyublyu"
"Dozhdis"
"Dolya"
"Na Zare"
"Svezhyi Veter"
"Edinstvennaya" (by Philipp Kirkorov)
"Tuman"
"Zagulyal"
"Greshnyi put" (by Valery Leontiev)
"Belyi sneg" (by Valery Leontiev)
"Moryachka"
"Baltiyskiy Bereg"
"Zabiray" (duet with Sofia Rotaru)
"Proshay"
"Vpered Rossiya"
"Sdelan v SSSR"

Awards
Candidate for Master of Sport of the USSR
Meritorious Artist of Russia (1995)
People's Artist of Russia (2002)
Order of Honour (2006)

|-
! colspan="3" style="background: cyan;" | World Music Awards
|-

|-

References

External links
Official website 
IMDb profile
Oleg Gazmanov Live at the World Music Awards 1992
Oleg Gazmanov at the Forbes

1951 births
Living people
Nationalist musicians
Russian nationalists
Soviet nationalists
Russian communists
Soviet communists
Anti-Ukrainian sentiment in Russia
People from Gusev
Russian pop singers
Recipients of the Order of Honour (Russia)
People's Artists of Russia
Honored Artists of the Russian Federation
UNICEF Goodwill Ambassadors
United Russia politicians
21st-century Russian politicians
Soviet male composers
Russian composers
Russian male composers
Soviet male singers
Russian record producers
Russian chanson
Winners of the Golden Gramophone Award
Russian male singer-songwriters
Soviet pop singers
Sanctioned due to Russo-Ukrainian War
Russian propagandists
Recipients of the Order "For Merit to the Fatherland", 4th class